Halil Akkaş (born 1 July 1983) is a Turkish middle-distance runner who won the 3000 m steeplechase at the 2005 World Student Games. He finished fourth in the 5000 m final at the 2006 European Athletics Championships in Gothenburg. At the 2007 European Athletics Indoor Championships he competed in 3000 m and finished fourth. He also finished fourth in the 1500 m final at the 2006 IAAF World Indoor Championships in Moscow and sixth in the 3000 m steeplechase at the 2007 IAAF World Championships in Osaka.

References

External links

 Interview with Halil Akkaş
 Interview with Halil Akkaş

1983 births
Fenerbahçe athletes
Living people
Olympic athletes of Turkey
Athletes (track and field) at the 2008 Summer Olympics
Athletes (track and field) at the 2016 Summer Olympics
Turkish male middle-distance runners
Turkish male steeplechase runners
People from Kütahya
Dumlupınar University alumni
World Athletics Championships athletes for Turkey
Mediterranean Games bronze medalists for Turkey
Athletes (track and field) at the 2009 Mediterranean Games
Universiade medalists in athletics (track and field)
Mediterranean Games medalists in athletics
Universiade gold medalists for Turkey
Universiade silver medalists for Turkey
Medalists at the 2005 Summer Universiade
Medalists at the 2007 Summer Universiade
Medalists at the 2009 Summer Universiade
Medalists at the 2011 Summer Universiade
21st-century Turkish people